Robert O. 'Bob' McEachern (March 9, 1927 – February 6, 2008) was an American politician and teacher.

McEachern was born in Saint Paul, Minnesota and grew up in Delano, Minnesota. He went to College of St. Thomas, University of Minnesota, and St. Cloud State University. He graduated from University of North Dakota with a major in industrial arts. McEachern served in the United States Navy during World War II and the Korean War. McEachern lived with his wife and family in St. Michael, Minnesota. and was a school teacher. He served as the mayor of St. Michael, Minnesota and was a Democrat. McEachern served in the Minnesota House of Representatives from 1973 to 1992. He died from Alzheimer's disease in an assisted living facility in Buffalo, Minnesota.

References

1927 births
2008 deaths
Politicians from Saint Paul, Minnesota
People from Buffalo, Minnesota
People from St. Michael, Minnesota
St. Cloud State University alumni
University of St. Thomas (Minnesota) alumni
University of Minnesota alumni
University of North Dakota alumni
Schoolteachers from Minnesota
Military personnel from Minnesota
Mayors of places in Minnesota
Democratic Party members of the Minnesota House of Representatives
Deaths from Alzheimer's disease